The 2006 Assen Superbike World Championship round was the ninth round of the 2006 Superbike World Championship. It took place on the weekend of September 1–3, 2006 at the TT Circuit Assen located in Assen, Netherlands.

Results

Superbike race 1 classification

Superbike race 2 classification

Supersport race classification

References
 Superbike Race 1
 Superbike Race 2
 Supersport Race

Assen
Assen Superbike